Mehmet Ataberk Dadakdeniz (born 5 August 1999) is a Turkish professional footballer who plays as a goalkeeper for the Süper Lig Antalyaspor.

Club career
Dadakdeniz is a youth product of Bursa Güvenspor and Bursaspor. He signed his first professional contract with Bursaspor on 16 May 2016 for 3 years. On 16 September 2021, he moved to Antalyaspor signing a 2.5 year contract. He made his professional debut with Antalyaspor as a starter in a 0–0 Süper Lig tie with Beşiktaş on 26 February 2023, saving a penalty and keeping a clean sheet.

International career
Dadakdeniz is a youth international for Turkey, having played up to the Turkey U23 in their winning campaign at the 2021 Islamic Solidarity Games.

Honours
Turkey U23
Islamic Solidarity Games: 2021

References

External links
 
 

1999 births
Living people
Footballers from İzmir
Turkish footballers
Turkey youth international footballers
Association football goalkeepers
Bursaspor footballers
Antalyaspor footballers
Süper Lig players
TFF First League players